Scissors kick may refer to:

 Scissor kick (martial arts), a move in martial arts and wrestling
 Bicycle kick, a move in association football
 Scissors kick (swimming), a leg movement used in some swimming strokes
 Scissor kick (finning)